Joel Akesson (born June 27, 1991) is a Swedish professional ice hockey player. He is currently playing with Östersunds IK of the Swedish Hockeyettan.

Akesson played one game with Linköpings HC in the Elitserien during the 2009–10 Elitserien season.

References

External links

1991 births
Linköping HC players
Living people
Swedish ice hockey left wingers
People from Östersund
Sportspeople from Jämtland County